AVG Technologies is a brand of cybersecurity, privacy, performance and utility software applications for desktop computers and mobile devices developed by Avast, a part of Gen Digital. AVG was a cybersecurity software company founded in 1991 and it merged into Avast following an acquisition in 2017. It typically offers freeware, earning revenues from advertisers and from users that upgrade to paid versions for access to more features. 

AVG was founded in 1990 in Czechoslovakia just as the country was transitioning from communism to capitalism. In the early 2000s, AVG expanded internationally and used money from venture capital investments to fund a series of acquisitions. AVG went public on the New York Stock Exchange in February 2012. Avast acquired AVG for $1.3 billion in July 2016.

History
AVG Technologies was founded by Tomáš Hofer and Jan Gritzbach in 1990 under the name Grisoft in Brno, Czechoslovakia. At the time, Czechoslovakia was starting to transition from communism to capitalism. Initially, Grisoft sold IT equipment and third-party software, in addition to its own antivirus product. Grisoft grew as the country loosened its international trade policies, so it could exchange technology with companies in Europe. By 1998, Grisoft had 13 employees.

Grisoft later expanded to the US market, creating an American company called AVG. Grisoft also expanded to the United Kingdom, the Netherlands, Germany, and other countries. For a time, the company was focused on bulk sales of antivirus software to computer manufacturers that sold PCs with Grisoft's software pre-installed. It started marketing software directly to consumers in 2006. In 2008, Grisoft changed the name of its parent company to AVG, the name already used for its software and for its American subsidiary. TA Associates invested an additional $200 million into the company that year for a minority stake in the business.

In 2001, Grisoft was sold to a venture capital firm Benson Oak Capital. The firm then sold a 65 percent interest in Grisoft to Intel Capital and Enterprise Investors for $52 million in 2005. The investments were used to fund a series of acquisitions. Grisoft bought spyware company Ewido Networks in 2006 and browser security company Exploit Prevention Labs in 2007. In 2009, AVG announced the acquisition of Sana Security, which analyzes software behavior. This was followed by the acquisition of mobile security startup DroidSecurity and iMedix Web Technologies in 2011  parental control software company Bsecure in 2012, and remote monitoring company Level Platforms in 2013.

AVG Technologies filed an initial public offering in February 2012. Additionally, former Mozilla CEO Gary Kovacs was appointed CEO of AVG. He led the effort to create a simple one-page privacy policy that discloses what data the company collects from users and what information about free users it sells to advertisers.

In 2014, AVG announced the acquisition of Location Labs, a cybersecurity company focused on mobile devices, for an estimated $220 million. AVG was acquired by Avast for $1.3 billion in July 2016. By this time, AVG had 600 employees, $155 million in annual revenue, and 95 million users. The combined entity became the world's largest antivirus company, with an estimated 20% of the market. There were Avast or AVG installations on 160 million mobile devices and 240 million desktop computers. The new combined entity incorporate their technology into combined software products and developed a new channel program to market them to small business owners. A few months later, an American private equity firm, TA Associates, bought a 25 percent interest in AVG for $200 million.

In 2015, AVG acquired the VPN company Privax and an Israeli-based gallery app company called MyRoll. It also released new software products for businesses that incorporate the technology of both companies. In July 2017 AVG acquired Piriform Software, a UK-based company that developed CCleaner, a cleanup utility with 130 million installations.

Software
AVG develops and markets software for IT security, privacy, performance optimization, and other utility services on desktop computers and mobile devices. It is one of the largest brands of cybersecurity software. 

AVG is best-known for its antivirus product. AVG AntiVirus is a freeware program that relies heavily on heuristic analysis to determine if a program's code is behaving like malicious software. It scans a computer's documents, programs, and emails for suspicious behavior, then rates each file's risk based on its behavior and alerts the user of files with a high rating. AVG Antivirus has features intended to protect the user's PC from malware, phishing, and viruses. It also has firewall, identity protection, anti-ransomware, anti-spam, and webcam control features for paid users. 

Avast also develops software for data backup, parental controls, and other services. AVG produces a variety of other computer optimization and utility software products. For example, a browser extension called AVG SafePrice looks for better deals online when the user is on a shopping site.

A majority of AVG's revenues come from free users upgrading to paid versions.

Controversy
In May 2012, AVG Technologies issued a copyright claim, referred to as a 'takedown request,' for a YouTube video of 1987 pop song "Never Gonna Give You Up", performed by British singer Rick Astley.  The video, which as of October 2015, has over 150 million views and 300,000 comments, had been uploaded in 2007, and was restored within 24 hours by YouTube.  The video's name refers to the internet meme commonly referred to as 'Rickrolling,' where someone pranks others by tricking them into going to the video.

AVG's browser add-on, AVG Secure Search, has been criticized as being adware, since it is frequently bundled with other software and is often mistakenly installed, and exhibits malware-like behavior. AVG Secure Search is also advertised to users of the free versions of AVG products. Although the add-on offers legitimate malware-blocking capabilities, the default behavior of changing the internet browser's default search engine, homepage, and new tab page to AVG Secure Search is reminiscent of a potentially unwanted program (PUP), problems uninstalling the add-on have been widely reported, and the add-on could potentially make an internet browser more vulnerable to attacks. AVG fixed these problems in its browser extension.

References

External links
 

 
Avast
1991 establishments in Czechoslovakia
2016 mergers and acquisitions
Companies formerly listed on the New York Stock Exchange
Computer security software companies
Czech brands
Gen Digital acquisitions
Software companies of the Czech Republic
Software companies established in 1991